Hematological and neurological expressed 1 protein is a protein that in humans is encoded by the HN1 gene.

NOTE: HN1 can also refer to the Notch 1 gene.

References

Further reading